Kandi Lenice Burruss Tucker (born May 17, 1976), known professionally by her mononym Kandi, is an American producer, television personality, singer, songwriter and actress. She first gained notice in 1992 as a member of the female vocal group Xscape. In 2000, she won a Grammy Award for Best R&B Song for her writing contributions on the TLC hit song "No Scrubs".

Burruss has starred in the Bravo reality television series The Real Housewives of Atlanta since its second-season premiere on July 30, 2009. Burruss has appeared in six Real Housewives spinoff and companion series as of 2022, beginning with 2012's The Kandi Factory, and continuing on with Kandi's Wedding (2014), Kandi's Ski Trip (2015), and Xscape: Still Kickin' It (2017), all of which were aired by Bravo. Burruss also appeared as a guest in Kim Zolciak-Biermann's wedding special Don't Be Tardy for the Wedding in 2012. Burruss's sixth Bravo companion series appearance, and fifth series overall to focus on Burruss, is called Kandi & the Gang, which premiered on March 6, 2022.

Burruss had a recurring role as Roselyn Perry in the third season of the Showtime drama series The Chi. She also won the third season of the Fox competition series The Masked Singer, and placed fifth on the second season of Celebrity Big Brother on CBS.

Early life 
Burruss was born in College Park, Georgia, the daughter of the Reverend Titus Burruss Jr. and Joyce Jones. She had an older brother, Patrick Riley (1968–1991), who died in a car crash. Burruss attended Tri-Cities High School in East Point, Georgia, graduating in 1994. She first appeared on the BET series Teen Summit at age 15.

Career

Xscape 
Prior to joining Xscape, LaTocha Scott had been performing with a group called Precise. While attending Tri-Cities performing arts high school in East Point, Georgia, Scott's sister Tamika met Kandi Burruss. The three began singing together and recruited a fourth member, Tamera Coggins, though her time with the group was short-lived. Soon Tameka "Tiny" Cottle was asked to audition for the girls, and Xscape was officially formed. After the group's major debut performance at BET's Teen Summit in 1992, the girls were introduced to record executive Ian Burke, who later became the group's manager. Xscape soon caught the attention of Jermaine Dupri, who later signed the group to his recording label So So Def Recordings.

On October 12, 1993, the group released their debut album, Hummin' Comin' at 'Cha. The album peaked at number seventeen the U.S. Billboard 200 and number three on the Top R&B Albums chart. It was a critical and commercial success, certified platinum within a year, and launched two top ten singles.
After their debut album's success, Xscape released their second studio album, Off the Hook, in 1995. The album eventually went platinum.
Their third and final studio album Traces of My Lipstick debuted at twenty-eight on the Billboard 200 and at six on the Hot R&B/Hip-Hop album chart; over a million copies were sold in the U.S. After Traces of My Lipstick, LaTocha Scott initially left the group to pursue a solo career. The ladies soon regrouped and made appearances on the Big Momma's House and Hardball soundtracks, before going on another hiatus until 2005.

In 2017, TV One had planned to produce an unauthorized movie about Xscape which Kandi Burruss did not want to happen against her and the group's wishes. She called other band members to discuss starting a show of their own. The show was named Xscape: Still Kickin' It, and set as a four-episode miniseries. On November 5, 2017, the show premiered on BravoTV. Before Kandi could rejoin the group, she wanted an apology from band member Tamika Scott, who claimed in a 2007 interview that Burruss broke up the group by sleeping with their label head Jermaine Dupri and his father, Michael Mauldin. Kandi wanted an apology for the false statement that Scott told regarding Mauldin, but did confirm that she and Dupri had been involved (though Burruss claims that wasn't the reason why the group broke up). Burruss received an apology from Scott on stage during a concert in Detroit in 2017.

Solo work and production 
After the disbanding of Xscape, Burruss focused on production and songwriting. In 1999, Burruss co-wrote, along with Kevin "She'kspere" Briggs, three major hit songs: "No Scrubs" for TLC, "Bills, Bills, Bills" for Destiny's Child, and "There You Go", Pink's debut single. All three songs had writing involvement by their respective artists, and "No Scrubs" was also co-written by Burruss's former groupmate Tameka "Tiny" Cottle.

In 2000, Kandi released her debut album, Hey Kandi..., which spawned the singles "Don't Think I'm Not" and "Cheatin' on Me". "Don't Think I'm Not" reached number 24 on the Billboard Hot 100. The album did not do as well on the chart as the lead single did, reaching #72 on the Billboard 200.

Burruss won the American Society of Composers, Authors and Publishers's Songwriter of the Year award in 2000, in the Rhythm & Soul category. She was the first African-American woman to win the award.

Burruss rewrote and executive produced the 2009 song "Tardy for the Party" for her Real Housewives of Atlanta co-star Kim Zolciak. On March 12, 2013, Kandi Burruss, and her collaborating songwriter/producer, Rodney "Don Vito" Richard, filed suit against Zolciak for profits earned from "Tardy for the Party". In the documents filed, Burruss' attorney, RHOA castmate Phaedra Parks, alleges her clients wrote the song for Zolciak and that Zolciak released and sold the single "without [the] plaintiffs' authorization, license or consent." Burruss was also seeking a temporary restraining order to prevent future sales of the song and the "destruction of all copies of the infringing single and any other product of defendant's that infringe plaintiffs' copyrights", punitive damages, attorney's fees, and a jury trial. The lawsuit was dismissed on October 12, 2013, after the presiding judge deemed that Burruss failed to furnish enough evidence of copyright infringement.

Following a hiatus from music, Burruss recorded her first EP, The Fly Above EP, which was released on October 29, 2009. In December 2009, Burruss announced she had signed a deal with Asylum Records after her deal with Capitol Records fell through. Her second album, Kandi Koated, was released in December 2010. Burruss also teamed with Atlanta female rapper Rasheeda to form the duo Peach Candy.

The 2017 song "Shape of You" by Ed Sheeran, which ranks as one of the most successful singles of all time, drew comparisons in its lyrical rhythm to "No Scrubs", particularly in the pre-chorus line, "Boy, let's not talk too much/ Grab on my waist and put that body on me." As a result, Burruss, Cottle, and Briggs were awarded co-writing credits on "Shape of You".

Reality television 

Replacing DeShawn Snow, Burruss joined The Real Housewives of Atlanta in its second season, which began airing in July 2009. She has since appeared in every subsequent season of the show, becoming the series' longest-serving cast member. When she first joined the show, she had recently become engaged to her boyfriend A.J. and was shown expressing interest in reviving her music career. A feud developed between her and Nene Leakes after Burruss became friends with Zolciak and helped her record her single "Tardy for the Party". In the third season, Zolciak and Burruss continued recording music together, although they clashed over their creative differences. A conflict between Burruss, Leakes, and Zolciak later ensued while the latter two women embarked on a promotional concert tour. In later seasons, Burruss struck up a friendship with castmates Phaedra Parks and Porsha Williams, even starring the latter a role in her production of A Mother's Love, a play that Burruss and her husband, Todd Tucker, created and produced. Sometime during her pregnancy with son Ace, a rift was shown between Phaedra and Kandi, eventually souring due to unpaid production fees that Parks owed Tucker.

Burrus received the second spin-off from The Real Housewives of Atlanta, The Kandi Factory, in 2012. It was originally planned as a one-time television special, but eventually ran for a full season. It followed Burruss and her record producers as they attempted to launch the music careers of undiscovered artists, with a new artist selected every episode. Burruss and Tucker then got another spin-off series on Bravo, titled Kandi's Wedding, which aired for five episodes in June and July 2014 and showed the two getting married. Kandi's Wedding brought in very high ratings for Bravo, and topped NeNe Leakes and Kim Zolciak's previous spin-offs. Her third spin-off series, Kandi's Ski Trip, was a three-part special that aired in 2015 after the conclusion of the seventh season of The Real Housewives of Atlanta.

Burruss was a contestant on the second season of the reality competition show Celebrity Big Brother. She placed fifth in the competition and was a fan favorite during her run on the show. She appeared as a guest judge on the "From Farm to Runway" episode of season 11 of RuPaul's Drag Race alongside model and actress Amber Valletta, which aired on April 11, 2019.

In 2020, she competed in the third season of The Masked Singer as "Night Angel". Burruss had been originally asked to compete in the first season, but was unable to participate due to other commitments. After watching T-Pain perform and having producers approach her again however, she reconsidered. Burruss won her season as the show's first female winner. In 2022, Burruss began starring in Bravo's Kandi & the Gang.

Other ventures 
Burruss has made cameo appearances on series such as Single Ladies, Thicker Than Water: The Tankards, Chef Roblé & Co., and Let's Stay Together.
Burruss also owns a sex toy company called Bedroom Kandi. Burruss and four friends started Kandi Koated Nights, a "sex and relationship" web series on Ustream. The show began airing on television in 2018.

Personal life 
Burruss is a member of the Church of Holiness.

Burruss and her ex-boyfriend, Russell "Block" Spencer of Block Entertainment, have a daughter named Riley Burruss, born on August 22, 2002. In late 2008, Burruss began a relationship with Ashley "A.J." Jewell and after several months of dating, the couple became engaged in January 2009. However, Jewell died on October 2, 2009, after sustaining head injuries in a brawl.

On January 15, 2013, Burruss announced via Twitter that she was engaged to Todd Tucker, a former line producer for The Real Housewives of Atlanta, whom she had been dating since 2011 while filming the fourth season. On April 4, 2014, the two were married in a lavish ceremony. In July 2015, Burruss announced that she was pregnant. She and Tucker welcomed their son on January 6, 2016. They welcomed their second child, a daughter, via surrogate on November 22, 2019. The couple resides in Atlanta, Georgia.

Discography 

Studio albums
 Hey Kandi... (2000)
 Can't Rain Forever (2006) (Shelved)
 Kandi Koated (2010)

Filmography

Film

Television

References

External links 
 
 
 
 
 
 

1976 births
African-American actresses
African-American women rappers
20th-century African-American women singers
African-American women singer-songwriters
African-American songwriters
African-American record producers
American film actresses
American dance musicians
American hip hop record producers
American hip hop singers
African-American television producers
American women television producers
American women rappers
American soul musicians
American television actresses
Grammy Award winners
Living people
People from College Park, Georgia
The Real Housewives cast members
Southern hip hop musicians
American contemporary R&B singers
21st-century American women singers
21st-century American singers
American women film producers
21st-century American rappers
American women record producers
Masked Singer winners
Women hip hop record producers
American women television personalities
African-American television personalities
African-American women in business
21st-century American businesswomen
21st-century American businesspeople
21st-century African-American women singers
Television producers from Georgia (U.S. state)
Singer-songwriters from Georgia (U.S. state)
21st-century women rappers